Tengelmann may refer to:

 Tengelmann Group, a holding company based in Mülheim an der Ruhr, Germany
 Ernst Tengelmann (1870 - 1954), German entrepreneur